The Tenerife Challenger is a professional tennis tournament played on hard courts. It is currently part of the ATP Challenger Tour. It is held annually in Tenerife, Spain since 2021.

Past finals

Singles

Doubles

References

ATP Challenger Tour
Hard court tennis tournaments
Tennis tournaments in Spain
Recurring sporting events established in 2021
 
Sport in Tenerife